MangoO Microfinance Management is a free and open-source software solution for the management of small-scale microfinance institutions (MFIs).

History 
Development of mangoO Microfinance software Management started in September 2014 when the SACCO of Luweero Diocese in Uganda sought to improve their administration. The major target was to computerise their hitherto manual and paper-based book-keeping. As other available software solutions seemed to target big-scale MFIs, they decided to design their own tailor-made solution.

Objectives 
The main target in the development of mangoO was to design a microfinance software with an extremely simple user interface. Most workers at Luweero Diocese SACCO were inexperienced in the use of computers in general. The software, therefore, needed to focus on ease of use and maximum automation. As a result, mangoO is best equipped to serve small-scale (primarily single-branch) MFIs.

Technological background 
For its major part, mangoO was written in PHP with some additional JavaScript and CSS. The database uses MySQL. As the required webserver can run locally as well as remotely, the system offers a maximum of flexibility for different scenarios. On the client side, only an ordinary web browser is needed.
MangoO was published on GitHub in 2015 under the GNU General Public Licence (GPLv3).

See also
 Banking software

References 

Microfinance software
PHP software
Financial software